Plaesius javanus, the Jepson's beetle, is a species of clown beetles belonging to the family Histeridae.

Description
These beetles have a glossy black body, with long and curved jaws and short antennae. Frontlegs are thin and expanded laterally. Elytra show 4–6 longitudinal grooves. Two abdominal rear segments are exposed.

These predatory histerid beetles have been introduced in some countries for the control of the banana weevil borer (Cosmopolites sordidus).

Distribution
This species is native to Southeastern Asia and Indonesia.

Bibliography
 Mazur, Slawomir (1997) A world catalogue of the Histeridae (Coleoptera: Histeroidea), Genus, International Journal of Invertebrate Taxonomy (Supplement)(1996), database, NODC Taxonomic Code
 Ôhara, Masahiro, and Slawomir Mazur (2000) A revision of the genera of the tribe Platysomatini (Coleoptera, Histerida, Histerinae). Part 3. Redescriptions of the type species of Althanus, Caenolister, Idister, Diister, Placodes, Plaesius, Hyposolenus and Aulacosternus. Insecta Matsumurana (N.S.), vol. 57

References

Histeridae
Beetles of Asia
Beetles described in 1834
Taxa named by Wilhelm Ferdinand Erichson